Hutka is a village in north-east Slovakia.

Hutka may also refer to the following villages:
Hutka, Greater Poland Voivodeship (west-central Poland)
Hutka, Silesian Voivodeship (south Poland)

See also
Huťka